{{Infobox football club|
| nickname = Royals
| ground = Cross Keys Reserve (Juniors) and Ormond Park (Seniors)
| clubname = Essendon Royals
| image = Essendon Royals Crest.png
| fullname = Essendon Royals Soccer Club
| founded  =  (earliest form) as Unione Sportiva Triestina as 'Essendon-Brunswick Royals' (present entity)'
| chairman = Richie Di Sauro
| manager = Vitale Ferrante
| league        = 
| season        = 
| position      = 
| website      = https://www.essendonroyals.com.au/
| current     = 2020 Football Victoria season
}}

Essendon Royals Soccer Club is an Australian semi-professional soccer club based in the North-Western Melbourne local government area of Moonee Valley. The club's senior men's squad currently participates in the National Premier Leagues Victoria 3, following promotion from Victorian State League 1 in 2022. The senior women's squad compete in Victoria Women's State League Division 1 North-West.

History
The club was originally founded as Unione Sportiva Triestina in 1959 by Italian immigrants from the seaport city of Trieste. Prior to the 1995 season, the club had completed its last merge of four merges, with six other original stand-alone clubs to form 'Essendon-Brunswick Royals', later renaming to its present name Essendon Royals for the 1999 season.

The club had two stints in the Victorian Premier League (VPL), the second highest level in Australian soccer, in 2001 and from 2003–07. 

The club has a current membership over 700 and currently fields teams in junior boys and girls leagues from 8 years to seniors. In August 2019, the club was granted a National Premier Leagues Victoria junior licence for its u13 to u16 teams. 

Vitale Ferrante was appointed as the club's senior men's coach for the 2020 season. After the COVID-19 pandemic resulted in the cancellation of the 2020 and 2021 seasons, Essendon Royals achieved promotion from Men's State League 1 North-West to National Premier Leagues Victoria 3 in the 2022 season. Earlier in the year, Vitale Ferrante stepped away from the head coach job, with his brother Michael Ferrante, an ex-professional footballer and until then player at the Royals since mid-2019, took over the manager role. 

Historical honours (1958–1994)
Anstey Roma (1968–1969)
Victorian Sixth Tier
Premiers (1): 1968 (Central)

Central Brunswick/Dallas City/Ivanhoe City (1973–1987)
Victorian Eighth Tier
Premiers (1): 1984
Victorian Eleventh Tier
Premiers (1): 1977

East Brunswick (1970–1986)
Victorian Sixth Tier
Third Place (promotion) (1): 1983
Victorian Seventh Tier
Premiers (2): 1972 (East), 1975 (East)

East Brunswick–Ivanhoe (1988–1994)
Victorian Fourth Tier
Runners–up (1): 1991
Victorian Fifth Tier
Premiers (1): 1990

Fiorentina (1958–1963)
Victorian Second Tier
Runners–up (2): 1961, 1963
Victorian Third Tier
Runners–up (1): 1959

Moonee Ponds (1973–1982)
Victorian Tenth Tier
Third Place (promotion) (1): 1977

Unione Sportiva Triestina/Maribyrnong Triestina/Essendon City Jets (1958–1994)
Victorian Second Tier
Premiers (1): 1963
Runners–up (1): 1986
Victorian Third Tier
Premiers (1): 1962
Victorian Fourth Tier
Runners–up (1): 1985
Victorian Fifth Tier
Premiers (1): 1973
Runners–up (1): 1976
Third Place (promotion)'' (1): 1983

Recent honours (1995–present)
Victorian Second Tier
Runners–up (2): 2000, 2002
Victorian Third Tier
Runners–up (1): 1999
Victorian Fourth Tier
Runners–up (2): 2016 (North–West), 2022 (North–West)
Victorian Fifth Tier
Premiers (1): 2014 (North–West)
Victorian Seventh Tier
Runners–up (1): 2011

See also

List of sports clubs inspired by others

References

External links
Essendon Royals SC (official website)
Football Federation Victoria (official website)
Essendon Royals Ozfootball Page

Soccer clubs in Melbourne
Victorian State League teams
Italian-Australian culture in Melbourne
Italian-Australian backed sports clubs of Victoria
Association football clubs established in 1959
1959 establishments in Australia
Essendon, Victoria
Sport in the City of Moonee Valley